Ceruana is a genus of flowering plants in the family Asteraceae.

There is only one known species, Ceruana pratensis, native to the Sahara and Sahel regions of Africa, from Egypt to Ethiopia to Senegal.

References

Astereae
Monotypic Asteraceae genera
Flora of Egypt
Flora of Northeast Tropical Africa
Flora of West Tropical Africa
Taxa named by Peter Forsskål